Paul Prince (May 14, 1720 – November 25, 1809) was a patriot in the American Revolutionary War.

Princes Point Road in Yarmouth, Maine, is now named for him.

Life and career 
Prince was born in Duxbury, Province of Massachusetts Bay, on May 14, 1720, a second son to shipwright Benjamin Prince and Abial Nelson. While Princes Point Road in Yarmouth, Maine, is named for Paul, Princes Point itself is named for his father, who died, aged 44, when Paul was seventeen years old; his mother died when he was twenty-four.

He married Hannah Cushing (1722–1814) in 1743. The couple had ten children, including Cushing Prince in 1745. The other nine were Sarah (born 1744), Rachel (1747), Hannah (1749), Ruth (1751), David (1753), Else (1756), Paul Jr. (1758), Pyam (1760) and Ammi (1763). Prince compiled a bible, known as the Paul Prince Bible, containing the record of births of his children. It was printed in Edinburgh in 1791.

Between 1775 and 1779, both Paul Sr. and Paul Jr. are listed as serving in the Cumberland County Regiment during the Revolutionary War.

Death 
Prince died in North Yarmouth, Massachusetts (now in Maine), on November 25, 1809, aged 89. He is interred in Congretional Cemetery in Cumberland Center, Maine, beside his wife, who survived him by just over four years.

References 

1720 births
1809 deaths
People from North Yarmouth, Maine
American diarists
People of the American Revolution